Lee Muller Thomas (born June 13, 1944) was Administrator of the United States Environmental Protection Agency from 1985 to 1989 under President Ronald Reagan. He succeeded William Ruckelshaus. He is a Republican.

Thomas led the EPA when the report Unfinished Business: A Comparative Assessment of Environmental Problems was released.

Thomas earned his Masters in Education from the University of South Carolina, where he did postgraduate work in psychology. He received his Bachelor of Arts degree in psychology from the University of the South in Sewanee, Tennessee.

He went on to become president and chief operating officer of Georgia-Pacific Corporation in 2005.

He was appointed president and chief executive officer of Rayonier, Inc. on March 1, 2007, and became chairman on July 1, 2007.

In 2008, Thomas served as a member of the board of directors for the following entities: Airgas, Inc., the Regal Entertainment Group, the Federal Reserve Bank of Atlanta, the World Resources Institute, the American Forest and Paper Association, and DuPont.

References

External links
 
 Interview with Lee M. Thomas regarding his career at EPA—EPA Alumni Association
 

1944 births
20th-century American businesspeople
Administrators of the United States Environmental Protection Agency
American chief executives
American chief operating officers
Directors of DuPont
Georgia-Pacific
Living people
People from Ridgeway, South Carolina
Reagan administration personnel
Sewanee: The University of the South alumni
University of South Carolina alumni